Kupres is a town and municipality located in Canton 10 of the Federation of Bosnia and Herzegovina, an entity of Bosnia and Herzegovina. As of 2013, it has a population of 5,057 inhabitants, while the town of Kupres has a population of 2,883 inhabitants.

Location

The town has good road (state road M-16) and bus access heading towards Tomislavgrad, Livno and Mostar, and is connected to the nearby town of Bugojno in Bosnia Proper via a tunnel called "Kupreška vrata" (en. "Gates of Kupres"). It also has daily bus line towards Croatian cities of Zagreb, Split and Osijek.

History
The first traces of humans date back to prehistoric times, with a few archaeological findings supporting that theses. In times between neolithic and IV. century B.C., area of Kupres was inhabited by the Illyrians (Dalmatae tribe) along with Celts, who were much more technologically advanced then Illyrians. Both of those nations left the area or were assimilated following Roman Conquest in the time of the first Roman Emperor Augustus, who governed it until its collapse in 476 A.D.

Kupres was first mentioned in documents from the Kingdom of Croatia which was based in nearby Duvno (now called Tomislavgrad). During its History, Kupres was part of Kingdom of Croatia, Bosnian Kingdom, the Ottoman Empire, Austro-Hungarian monarchy following the conquest and annexation of Bosnia. After World War I, Kupres found itself in State of Croats, Slovenes and Serbs (SHS), and slightly afterwards in Kingdom of Yugoslavia (within Vrbas Banovina and the Banovina of Croatia (until 1939)). During World War II, Kupres was strategically important town of Independent State of Croatia defended by notorious Black Legion and place where famous Battle of Kupres took place in 1942. After collapse of Nazi Germany and its puppet state of NDH, Kupres became part of newly founded Socialist Federal Republic of Yugoslavia within SR Bosnia and Herzegovina and it stayed that until 1992 and proclamation of independence of Bosnia and Herzegovina that led to War in Bosnia and Herzegovina. During that time, Kupres was held by Serbian forces from April 1992 and was part of Republic of Srpska. Kupres was taken back by Croatian forces in November 1994, when it became part of Croatian Republic of Herzeg-Bosnia and after its dissolution, part of Federation of Bosnia and Herzegovina, until this day.

Strategic importance and battles during WW2 and Bosnian war
The town is situated in the middle of the Kupres Plain (Kupreško Polje), which has high strategic importance because of its control of traffic communication between Dalmatia and Central Bosnia. That made Kupres important in previous wars, which is seen in famous saying: "Who holds this high plain can negotiate with its enemies in any way he wishes."

Kupres was scene of Battle of Kupres fought in 1942 during World War 2 in Independent State of Croatia between the forces of the Independent State of Croatia and the Yugoslav Partisans, in and around the town of Kupres in western Bosnia.

Kupres was the scene of fierce fighting in the recent War in Bosnia and Herzegovina in the 1990s, leaving the town extensively damaged and the local economy in ruins. Both are being rebuilt and restored to the benefit of the community and the region, especially where related to tourism infrastructure.

The first battle took place in 1992, when town of Kupres fell into Serbian hands. The Battle was fought between the Bosnian Croat Territorial Defence Force (Teritorijalna obrana – TO) supported by the Croatian Army (Hrvatska vojska – HV) troops on one side and the Yugoslav People's Army (Jugoslovenska narodna armija – JNA), augmented by the Bosnian Serb TO on the other at the Kupres Plateau, on 3–11 April 1992. Croatian forces were hampered by an inadequate command structure, poor coordination and lack heavy weapons. The battle resulted in more than 200 combat deaths, and established lines of control which would remain unchanged until 1994, when the plateau was recaptured by the HVO. In 2012, Republika Srpska authorities charged seven Croats with war crimes committed at the plateau against civilians and prisoners of war. The next year, Croatian authorities charged 21 former JNA members with war crimes against HVO prisoners captured at the Kupres Plateau.

The second battle during the Bosnian war took place in 1994 and was fought between the Army of the Republic of Bosnia and Herzegovina (ARBiH) and the Croatian Defence Council (HVO) on one side and the Army of Republika Srpska (VRS) on the other from 20 October to 3 November 1994. It marks the first tangible evidence of the Bosniak–Croat alliance set out in the Washington Agreement of March 1994, brokered by the United States to end the Croat–Bosniak War fought between the ARBiH and the HVO in Bosnia and Herzegovina. On 29 October, the HVO decided to attack, as it considered the ARBiH had directly threatened the strategic Kupres plateau. The HVO launched its offensive, codenamed Operation Cincar (Operacija Cincar), on 1 November. Following a brief lull in the ARBiH advance, thought to be brought on by a variety of causes and a direct request by the president of Bosnia and Herzegovina Alija Izetbegović to the ARBiH to cooperate with the HVO, commanding officers of the two forces met to coordinate their operations for the first time since the Washington Agreement. Kupres itself was captured by the HVO on 3 November 1994. Besides the political significance of the battle for future developments of the war in Bosnia, the battle was militarily significant for planning and execution of Operation Winter '94 by the Croatian Army (HV) and the HVO aimed at relieving the siege of Bihać in late November and December 1994. Territorial gains made by the HVO and the ARBiH in the Battle of Kupres safeguarded the right flank of Operation Winter '94.

1995 Division of pre-war municipality of Kupres 
Following the Dayton Agreement, which split Bosnia and Herzegovina following the War in Bosnia and Herzegovina according to ethnic lines and war frontlines, the town has evolved into a Croat-dominated town. The ethnic Serb population have mostly left forming their own municipality from northernmost part of pre-war municipality (called Kupres, Republika Srpska, which includes village Novo Selo) and it is within the Republika Srpska.

Demographics

Population

Ethnic composition

Religion
According to official release of Bosnia and Herzegovina Census of 2013, the religious structure of the municipality was:
 Roman Catholic – 4476
 Eastern Orthodox – 165
 Muslim – 130
 Agnostic – 1
 Atheist – 5

The town of Kupres has a Roman Catholic church in the parish of Holy Family and a mosque of Ahmed Fazil Paša – both the Roman Catholic church and Muslim mosque were destroyed by Serbian forces after the Battle of Kupres in 1992.

Culture
Kupres is famous for stećak tombstones. There is one large group of stećak tombstones called Ravanjska vrata and one in Rastičevo. Kupres is also famous for tumuli-burial mounds. In one of those, archaeologists found a grave and a skeleton. It is believed to be more than 3000 years old and it is now kept in Gorica museum in Livno.

There is an annual cultural and agricultural fair ("Strljanica") held in Kupres each first Sunday of July.

The largest cultural institution in town of Kupres is Hrvatski dom Kupres ("Croatian home Kupres"), previously known as "Dom Kulture" ("Home of Culture").

UNESCO Intangible Cultural Heritage of Humanity
Since 2020, Grass mowing competition custom in Kupres ("Strljanica") is inscribed as UNESCO Intangible Cultural Heritage of Humanity.
The most important social event in the Kupres municipality is the annual mowing competition that takes place in July at a specific meadow called Strljanica, which is also the local name for the custom. The contest involves the manual mowing of grass using a scythe and is judged by the time, effort and amount mown as cutting grass at that altitude requires strength and a special technique. The top three mowers are recognized, with the chief mower treated as a leader who ensures the successful mowing of all the fields to gather hay for the cattle; agriculture and cattle breeding are essential parts of the area’s economy. Men, starting from the age of eighteen, are traditionally the competitors, with the element being transmitted within families from father to son. Women rake the grass and prepare food for guests. Other elements linked to the competition include national costumes, the forging of scythes and the preparation of cattle for competition. All ethnic and religious groups and individuals in Kupres are free to participate, with the custom being considered as a foundation of the area’s cultural identity, regardless of people’s background. The bearers themselves and the Kupres Mowers Association are most responsible for safeguarding the element.

Guinness World Record
The largest gathering of people with the same first name (Ivan) is 2,325, and was achieved by Kupreški kosci (Bosnia and Herzegovina) in Kupres, Bosnia and Herzegovina, on 30 July 2017.

Education 
Town of Kupres has one elementary school and two highschools.

Tourism

Kupres is a famous ski resort in Bosnia and Herzegovina where majority of visitors coming from Dalmatia and Herzegovina, mostly because of Kupres's proximity to those regions.  Croatian Kuna is often accepted as currency in many of the town's businesses due to high levels of Croatian visitors. There are three main ski centers located at nearby mountains of Čajuša (ski center "Adria ski") and Stožer (ski center "Stožer" & ski center "Ski Ivan").

Kupres is also famous for its active tourism that doesn't include skiing, like motocross, paragliding, horse-riding and off-road driving.

The town also has a large natural lake called "Kukavičko jezero"

Twin towns – sister cities

Kupres is twinned with:
 Baška Voda, Croatia
 Gospić, Croatia
 Kaštela, Croatia
 Valpovo, Croatia

See also
 Tropolje

References

External links

Cities and towns in the Federation of Bosnia and Herzegovina
Populated places in Kupres
Municipalities of Canton 10